János Csák (born 15 October 1962) is a Hungarian corporate leader, honorary professor of management, who has been the Minister of Culture and Innovation since 24 May 2022. Formerly, he served as Ambassador of Hungary to the United Kingdom between 2011 and 2014.

Education 
Csák holds an MSc in Finance and Sociology from the Corvinus University of Budapest (Hungary, 1987), and completed the Challenge of Leadership Program, INSEAD (France, 2000) and the Executive Program at the University of Michigan Business School (USA, 1996).

Career 
During his career Csák worked in executive and board positions for several companies in Europe, the US and Australia including Matáv (treasurer, 1993–2000), MOL Group (chairman, 1999–2000), T-Mobile Hungary (incl. chairman, 1997–2001), Creditanstalt Investment Bank (CA-IB), Budapest Bank (GE Money Bank), Gedeon Richter Plc. (non-executive board member, 2014–2019) Falcon Oil and Gas, and Wildhorse Energy Ltd.

He worked as treasurer of Matáv (now Magyar Telekom) playing an instrumental role in Matáv's $1 billion listing on the New York Stock Exchange, a deal seen as the model for future privatizations winning the International Financing Review Award in 1997. Csák also crafted and negotiated the biggest mobile deal in the Central European region to its date: the acquisition of Westel (now T-Mobile) for $885 million from MediaOne in 1999. Under his leadership in finance Matáv won the World's Best User of Syndicated Loans Award (Euromoney, 1997).

In 1996 he was a Senior Treasury Advisor at Ameritech Corporation (Chicago, USA).

During his tenure as chairman of the board at MOL in 1999–2000, he orchestrated a comprehensive growth strategy which resulted in the reconstruction of the leadership and the strategy of the group. Under his tenure, MOL acquired the Slovakian energy company Slovnaft. As a result, MOL Group became a top-notch enterprise in the oil industry and a regional leader.

He was an executive board member of Creditanstalt Investment Bank, a Vienna-based comprehensive investment bank focusing on Central-Eastern Europe in 2001–2003, where he supervised the energy and telecom practices.

Between 2003 and 2010, Csák ran his own management and strategic advisory practice. As an investor, he turned around a number of companies, notably he revitalized Helikon's (a publisher of quality literature and art), and Heti Válasz's (a magazine reaching over 1% of the population nationwide, covering politics, economy and culture) brand strategy, and successfully sold both as efficient companies.

Csák was a visiting fellow in political economy and energy security at The Heritage Foundation in Washington, DC and at Acton Institute, in Grand Rapids, Michigan in 2009–10.

He served as Hungary's Ambassador accredited to the United Kingdom between 2011 and 2014.

Between 2016 and 2019 he was part-owner and Chairman of Design Terminal, a non-profit incubator, part-owner and Chairman of Arete Ltd., an early-stage investment company, and part-owner of Brain Bar, a major European festival on the future. Although he sold these companies in 2019, he still remains active in the startup ecosystem.

Between 2017 and 2021 he was the Head of ConNext 2050 project at the Socialfuturing Center of the Corvinus University Budapest.

Between 2019 and 2020 he served on the board of trustees of the Maecenas Universitatis Corvini Foundation, the endowment managing Corvinus University of Budapest.

From 2019 to 2021 he was on the supervisory board of Blue Planet Climate Protection Investments (Kék Bolygó Klímavédelmi Befektetési Zrt.).

Currently, he serves as a non-executive director of Bank of China (CEE) Ltd. and is also co-chairman of the Hungarian Slovakian Chamber of Commerce. In 2019, he was elected as a member of the Ethics Subcommittee of the Hungarian Olympic Committee.

He is a member of the supervisory board of the Saint Francis Foundation of Déva. In 2003 he founded the Kálmán Széll Foundation an association of business leaders.

Awards 
In recognition of his economic and social activities he was awarded the Commander's Cross of the Order of Merit of Hungary in 2010. He was conferred the Honorary Citizenship of the 20th district of Budapest (2013), and the Knight Grand Cross of Merit of the Sacred Military Constantinian Order of Saint George (UK, 2013).

Personal life 

He is married to Júlia Márton, they have four children and five grandchildren. In his spare time, Csák enjoys literature. In addition to writing essays, he also translated several books to Hungarian including novels and professional literature.

References 

1962 births
Living people
Ambassadors of Hungary to the United Kingdom
Hungarian business executives
Hungarian economists
Culture ministers of Hungary
Members of the fifth Orbán government